The Leaving of Liverpool is a 1992 television drama, an Australian–British co-production between the Australian Broadcasting Corporation (ABC) and British Broadcasting Corporation (BBC). The series was about the Home Children, the migration scheme which saw over 100,000 British children sent to Commonwealth realms such as Australia, New Zealand, Canada and South Africa.

Plot
The series follows two children—Lily (played by Christine Tremarco) and Bert (Kevin Jones)—who meet at the Star of the Sea Orphanage in Liverpool, England in the early 1950s. They go to Australia as child migrants where they are separated and are ill-treated.  Lily is eventually reunited with her mother and returns to Britain with her but Bert is sent to a young offenders institution.

Cast
 Christine Tremarco – Lily
 Kevin Jones – Bert
 Frances Barber – Ellen
 John Hargreaves – Harry
 Bill Hunter – Father O'Neill
 Frank Whitten – Brother Jerome
 Darren Yap – Dave

Production
The screenplay was written by writing partners John Alsop and Sue Smith who were working together on the miniseries Brides of Christ. Alsop read a review of a book about the child migration scheme, Lost Children of the Empire. Although the scheme had continued until 1967 and had affected thousands of children, little was known about it. Alsop approached Penny Chapman, head of drama at the ABC, with the idea for the story and she approved the funding. Michael Wearing, head of drama at the BBC, also agreed to fund and produce the drama.

Broadcast
The Leaving of Liverpool first went to air over two nights, 8 and 9 July 1992, in Australia on ABC TV.

The series was not shown in the UK until over a year later, when it was shown on BBC1 on 15 and 16 July 1993. The Child Migrants Trust, a charity representing child migrants, criticised the BBC for refusing to display a helpline number for the Trust, as the ABC had. The BBC responded that the series was a drama, not a documentary, and the corporation did not publicise helplines after drama programmes.

Awards
In the Logie Awards of 1993, The Leaving of Liverpool was nominated for Most Popular Telemovie or Mini Series, and won the award for Most Outstanding Telemovie or Mini Series.

References

External links

The Leaving of Liverpool at Australian Screen Online

1990s Australian television miniseries
1990s British television miniseries
1992 television films
1992 films
Australian Broadcasting Corporation original programming
BBC television dramas
1992 Australian television series debuts
1992 Australian television series endings
Films about forced migration
Films directed by Michael Jenkins